The National Pledge of Barbados is as follows

I pledge allegiance to my country Barbados and to my flag,
To uphold and defend their honour,
And by my living to do credit
To my nation wherever I go.

According to the Barbados government website, the Pledge was created by Lester Vaughan, born in 1910. Vaughan died on 16 September 2003, at the age of 92.

See also
National symbols of Barbados

References 

Barbadian culture
National symbols of Barbados
Oaths of allegiance
Vexillology